The Linguistic Association of Canada and the United States (LACUS) was founded in August 1974 by a group of linguists of the Great Lakes region. This was largely a reaction against the narrowing of the field
following Noam Chomsky’s generative grammar theory. Its annual meetings are held at colleges and universities in both countries, from which volumes of proceedings are published under the title LACUS Forum.

Notes

External links
LACUS homepage

Professional associations based in Canada
Scientific societies based in Canada
Linguistic societies
Academic organizations based in Canada
1974 establishments in Canada
1974 establishments in the United States
Organizations established in 1974
Academic organizations based in the United States